George Frederick Baldwin (3 April 1878 – 15 May 1970) was an English cricketer.  Baldwin's batting and bowling styles are unknown.  He was born at Northampton, Northamptonshire.

Baldwin made a single first-class appearance for Northamptonshire against Leicestershire in the 1906 County Championship.  He batted once in this match, scoring 6 runs before being dismissed by William Odell.  With the ball he bowled 8 wicketless overs.

He died at Burton upon Trent, Staffordshire on 15 May 1970.

References

External links
George Baldwin at ESPNcricinfo
George Baldwin at CricketArchive

1878 births
1970 deaths
Cricketers from Northampton
English cricketers
Northamptonshire cricketers